Barbara herrichiana is a moth of the family Tortricidae. It is found in central Europe, Spain, Greece and Ukraine.

The wingspan is 16–22 mm. Adults are on wing in April and May.

The larvae feed on Abies alba, Abies cephalonica, Abies numidica and on occasion also on Picea. It is considered a significant pest of Abies. The larvae live inside the cones of the host plant, feeding on the seeds.

External links
Eurasian Tortricidae

Tortricidae of Europe
Insects of Turkey
Moths described in 1960